Chicago Pro Musica is a chamber ensemble founded in 1979 by pianist Easley Blackwood and clarinetist John Bruce Yeh. The ensemble recorded a number of sessions at Medinah Temple for Reference Recordings. Chicago Pro Musica's 1985 "FACADE" recording of William Walton's "FACADE" and Stravinsky's L'Histoire du Soldat earned the ensemble a Grammy award for Best New Classical Artist.

Notable members 

 Easley Blackwood (piano)
 John Bruce Yeh (clarinet)
 Robert Black (saxophone)
 Willard Elliot (bassoon)
 Daniel Gingrich (horn)
 Richard Graef (flute)
 Joseph Guastafeste (bass)
 Albert Igolnikov (violin)
 Donald Koss (percussion)
 Don Moline (cello)
 George Vosburgh (trumpet)

References

Musical groups established in 1979
Chamber music groups
Cedille Records artists